The phrase Parcel of Rogues is taken from the Robert Burns poem Such a Parcel of Rogues in a Nation. It may specifically refer to:

Such a Parcel of Rogues in a Nation, the folk song based on the Burns poem. The melody of this song is originally found in James Hogg's book Jacobite Reliques
Parcel of Rogues (album), an album by Steeleye Span which includes this song.
A Parcel of Rogues (album), an album by The Dubliners which also includes this song.
 1635: A Parcel of Rogues, a novel of the Ring of Fire by Eric Flint and Andrew Dennis, published by Baen Books.